Fiesco  may refer to:

Places
Italy
Fiesco, Lombardy, a comune in the Province of Cremona

People
Giovanni Luigi Fieschi, a Genovese nobleman

Entertainment
Fiesco (play), a drama by German writer Friedrich Schiller